Manacapuru River is a river of Amazonas state in north-western Brazil. Parts of the river are very broad, appearing as elongated lakes, with the uppermost known as Lago Grande de Manacapuru ("Large Manacapuru Lake") and the lowermost, near where it merges into the Amazon, as Lago Manacapuru ("Lake Manacapuru").

See also
List of rivers of Amazonas

References
Brazilian Ministry of Transport

Rivers of Amazonas (Brazilian state)
Tributaries of the Amazon River